The Crimson Stain Mystery is a 1916 American horror film serial directed by T. Hayes Hunter. The Crimson Stain Mystery was poorly received upon release. Prints and/or fragments were found in the Dawson Film Find in 1978.

Plot
In this serial, Dr. Burton Montrose, a scientist, has developed a formula which he believes will make ordinary people into geniuses. He experiments on several subjects and, to his horror, finds that it instead creates wicked criminals. The resulting band of murderers and thieves is led by the evil Pierre La Rue, also known as the Crimson Stain for his luminous, red-rimmed eyes. He and his gang terrorize New York City. They are pursued by Layton Parrish, a detective, and by Harold Stanley, editor of the Examiner newspaper, who has vowed vengeance for his father's murder. Aiding Stanley are his friend, Robert Clayton, and his sweetheart, Florence Montrose, Dr. Montrose's daughter. Neither she nor anyone else knows the mysterious Crimson Stain to be none other than the doctor himself, subject of his own experiments.

Cast
 Maurice Costello as Harold Stanley/Pierre La Rue
 Ethel Grandin as Florence Montrose
 Thomas J. McGrane as Dr. Burton Montrose
 Olga Olonova as Vanya Tosca
 John Milton as Layton Parrish
 N.J. Thompson as Jim Tanner
 Eugene Strong as Robert Clayton

Chapter titles
 The Brand of Satan
 In The Demon's Spell
 The Broken Spell
 The Mysterious Disappearance
 The Figure In Black
 The Phantom Image
 The Devil's Symphony
 In The Shadow of Death
 The Haunting Spectre
 The Infernal Fiend
 The Tortured Soul
 The Restless Spirit
 Despoiling Brutes
 The Bloodhound
 The Human Tiger
 The Unmasking

See also
 List of American films of 1916
 List of film serials
 List of film serials by studio

References

External links

lobby art;for episode #4 "The Mysterious Disappearance"(archived)

1916 films
1916 horror films
American silent serial films
American black-and-white films
American horror films
Film serials
Films directed by T. Hayes Hunter
1910s American films
Silent horror films